Sheffer is a surname, and may refer to:

 Alla Sheffer, Israeli-Canadian computer scientist
 Craig Sheffer (born 1960), American actor
 Daniel Sheffer (1783–1880), U.S. congressman
 Doron Sheffer (born 1972), Israeli basketball player
 Henry M. Sheffer (1882–1964), American logician
 Hogan Sheffer (born 1958), American screenwriter
 Isador M. Sheffer (1901–1992), American mathematician
 Walter Sheffer (1918–2002), American photographer